Hugh Edward Mark Osmond (born March 1962) is an entrepreneur and businessman and was the founder of Punch Taverns, one of the UK's largest chains of public houses.

Early life
Hugh Edward Mark Osmond was born in March 1962, the son of a doctor, and educated at Merton College, Oxford where he read medicine.

Career
Osmond went to the US in 1983 and worked in clubs for a while. He then joined a small investment bank in Madrid. Returning to the UK he worked with Luke Johnson to launch the flotation of PizzaExpress in 1993. In 1997 he founded Punch Taverns which was one of the UK's largest chains of pubs: he was chairman of Punch Taverns from 1997 to 2001. In 2002 he became a leading partner in Sun Capital Partners: that vehicle secured a major investment in Pearl Group in 2005.

In 2001, he founded the London-based private equity firm, Sun Capital Partners Limited. Nowadays he is related to several companies e.g. Morris United Limited, Alphabet Shares Limited, SCP Hotels Limited and Various Eateries Limited.

According to The Sunday Times Rich List in 2020 his net worth was estimated at £232 million.

Public life
Osmond is a significant donor to the Conservative Party.

Personal life
Osmond owns a shooting estate in Berkshire, and maintains homes in Moulsford in Oxfordshire, Wadebridge in Cornwall, and Marylebone in west London.

See also
Mike Fairey

References

1962 births
Alumni of Merton College, Oxford
British company founders
British hospitality businesspeople
English businesspeople
Living people